The following are notable peoples who died by suicide in the year 2001 and after. Suicides under duress are included. Deaths by accident or misadventure are excluded. Individuals who might or might not have died by their own hand, or whose intention to die is in dispute, but who are widely believed to have deliberately died by suicide, may be listed under Possible suicides.

Confirmed suicides

A

B

C

D

E

F

G

H

I

J

K

L

M

N

O

P

Q

R

S

T

U

V

W

Y

Z

Possible suicides

References

External links 
 Hollywood Suicides – slideshow by Life
 Famous Artist Suicides – slideshow by Life
 Famous Suicides

Suicides
Suicides
Suicides in the 21st century
Suicide-related lists